Aike is a hamlet, locally known as a village, in the East Riding of Yorkshire, England. The hamlet is centred around a single developed street, which lies to the east of the Yorkshire Wolds. It is approached by a  lane which is a no-through road that does not continue beyond the village, although a farm track continues as far as a bridge across the Beverley and Barmston Drain.

History and toponymy
Toponymy
The village name means "oak". In the local dialect, the name was not rounded to be recorded as oak or oake unlike equivalents — it remained the Old English āc. The name is sometimes pronounced "Yack".

Civil and ecclesiastical parish of the hamlet
Between 1865 and 1935, Aike was its own civil parish, the lowest level of English local government. Previous to that, it was in the parish of Lockington. It reverted to Lockington in 1935, which is the ecclesiastical parish of Lockington and Aike anyway because of St Mary's Church in Lockington, which lies  further west of the hamlet. In traditional definitions and histories of the county, Aike is a hamlet falling short of a chapelry as it has never had a Church of England chapel/church; however the term hamlet is becoming defunct.

Former status as an island
The land around Aike is too low-lying to drain into the nearby River Hull. Before construction began on the Beverley and Barmston Drain in 1798, Aike's cluster of central houses were on a small island.

Economy and landmarks
Aike Grange Stud is a dressage park, and hosts regional competitions.  Eighteenth-century "Sunnyside" or "Sunnyside cottage" is a brick-built, colour-washed house with a pantile roof and sash windows, designated the area's sole grade II listed building. It was listed in 1987.

References

External links
 
 Village website
 

Villages in the East Riding of Yorkshire